Causer is a surname. Notable people with the surname include:

 Arthur Causer (1884–1927), English footballer
 Martin Causer (born 1973), American politician
 Murder of Michael Causer (1989–2008)

See also
 Hauser